is a Japanese supernatural horror comedy manga series by Rensuke Oshikiri. It was serialized in Flex Comix's free web comic FlexComix Blood from April 11, 2007, to August 5, 2009. It was collected in three tankōbon volumes from March 6, 2008, to November 10, 2009. A 15-episode anime television series adaptation by AIC Plus+ aired between December 20, 2013, and March 28, 2014, on TV Tokyo.

Characters

A third grader who is a quiet and humble girl. Because she can see things no one else can see, she is called a liar and a witch by other people in her class.

An unknown creature who protects Himeji from the supernaturals manifestations and curses. He can absorb ghosts.

Media

Manga

See also
Hi Score Girl, another manga series by Rensuke Oshikiri
Semai Sekai no Identity, another manga series by Rensuke Oshikiri

References

External links
 

2000s webcomics
2009 webcomic endings
2014 Japanese television series endings
Anime International Company
Anime series based on manga
Comedy anime and manga
FlexComix Blood and FlexComix Next manga
Horror comedy
Horror anime and manga
Japanese webcomics
Shōnen manga
Supernatural anime and manga
TV Tokyo original programming
Webcomics in print